Arlen Konwar (born 1 January 1981) is an Indian cricketer from Assam. He made his debut in first-class cricket for Assam in 2001-02 Ranji Trophy. He is a right-arm off break bowler. Konwar is the best spin bowler Assam has ever produced. He is the highest wicket taker of Assam in first class cricket with more than 200 wickets.

References

External links
 
 

Indian cricketers
Assam cricketers
People from Sivasagar district
1981 births
Living people